Muzaffar Ahmad (27 March 1936 – 22 May 2012) was a Bangladeshi economist and an emeritus professor at the Institute of Business Administration of the University of Dhaka. He received his PhD from the University of Chicago. He was also the Chairman of the Trustee Board of Transparency International Bangladesh (TIB). Ahmed was awarded the Ekushey Padak by the Government of Bangladesh in 2008.

Ahmed was also associated with an organization called "Sushashoner Jonno Nagarik", popularly called "Sujon," which promotes good governance. He was also one of the most prominent environmentalists in Bangladesh.

Books

See also 

 List of Bangladeshi economists

References 

1936 births
2012 deaths
20th-century Bangladeshi economists
Recipients of the Ekushey Padak
Academic staff of the University of Dhaka
University of Chicago alumni
Burials at Azimpur Graveyard
Comilla Victoria Government College alumni